Kelvin Kalua (born 10 July 1999) is a New Zealand footballer who plays as a right-back for Eastern Suburbs and the New Zealand national team.

Career
A youth product of Ellerslie from 2010 to 2017, Kalua moved to Eastern Suburbs  in the summer of 2017. He made his senior debut with Eastern Suburbs in a 2–0 New Zealand Football Championship win over Waitakere United on 17 December 2017. He helped the team win the 2018–19 New Zealand Football Championship.

International career
Born in Malawi, Kalua moved to New Zealand in 2006 at the age of six and eventually became a citizen. He made his international debut with the New Zealand national team in a 2–1 friendly win over Curaçao on 9 October 2021.

Honours
Eastern Suburbs
New Zealand Football Championship: 2018–19

References

External links
 

1999 births
Living people
New Zealand association footballers
New Zealand international footballers
Malawian footballers
New Zealand people of Malawian descent
Association football fullbacks
New Zealand Football Championship players